The 2012 AFC Champions League qualifying play-off was contested by nine teams (five from West Zone, four from East Zone).

The draw for the qualifying play-off was held at the AFC house in Kuala Lumpur, Malaysia on 6 December 2011, 15:00 UTC+08:00. The draw, without any seeding or country protection, determined the brackets as well as host of each play-off match. The semi-final round was played on 10 February 2012, and the final round was played 16 and 18 February 2012.

Extra time and penalty shootout would be used to decide the winner if necessary. The four winners of the final round (two from West Zone, two from East Zone) advanced to the group stage to join the 28 teams which directly entered the group stage. The three losers of the final round (two from West Zone, one from East zone) advanced to the 2012 AFC Cup group stage, except the loser of the match between Adelaide United and Persipura Jayapura.

Matches

West Zone

!colspan="3"|Semi-final Round

|-
!colspan="3"|Final Round

|}

Semi-final round

Final round

East Zone

!colspan="3"|Final Round

|}

The following team was also slated to enter the qualifying play-off in the East Zone, but did not enter the competition:
 Liaoning Whowin

Final round

References

External links
 

Qualifying play-off